Lotpot is a bilingual comic magazine published by Mayapuri Group. Lotpot title was registered by Mr. A.P. Bajaj in 1969 and the first issue came out in the same year and has been published without a break since then. Popular characters of Lotpot Comics "Motu Patlu" have a 3D animated show successfully running since the last 10 years on Nickelodeon India TV Channel and still continues entertaining kids with its rib tickling content.

History
Initially it was a weekly magazine which later on switched to fortnightly magazine after 2011. Later on, the magazine started publishing in English as well as Hindi. The circulation of Hindi versions reached 175,000 and of English version to 225,000.

Lotpot Comics belongs to the famous Mayapuri Group (www.mayapurigroup.com). It was started by Late Shri. A.P.Bajaj who successfully ran a printing press for calendars after he migrated from Pakistan to India in 1947. After the success of Lotpot Comics he launched Mayapuri Magazine which is into Bollywood Journalism.

Characters of Lotpot Comics got the opportunity to feature on air and became a superhit show for kids such as Motu Patlu and Sheikh Chilli on Nickelodeon and Discovery Kids respectively.

Chacha Chaudhary – the famous and legendary cartoon character of Hindi comic strip, was created by Pran Kumar Sharma in 1969 for Lotpot magazine, though it made its first appearance in 1971 in Lotpot.

Associations
Lotpot Comics has had popular brand associations and collaborations in the past few years. Below are some of the associations.

Nickelodeon (India TV Channel) – Motu Patlu's 3D animated cartoon show completed 10 years (2012-2022) on Nickelodeon India TV channel and still continues to entertain audiences.

Income Tax Department – Recently the Income Tax department created comic books where Motu Patlu explain the benefits of paying taxes and its use for the public good and infrastructure development in India. The comic books were launched by Honorable Finance Minister of India, Nirmala Sitaraman.

Madame Tussauds India – Madame Tussauds India placed the Motu Patlu statues along with other famous known personalities at DLF Mall of India, Noida along with the Motu Patlu Statues there is also an interactive comic book screen with LOTPOT Characters and Neetu's Adventure Tapping Game for audiences to play. The same has been well received and engaged audiences regularly. There is also a Motu Patlu - Madame Tussauds comic book available for sale at the merchandise counter.

Austrian Embassy – The Austrian Embassy in Delhi collaborated with Lotpot Comics to release 2 comic books. Motu Patlu in Salzberg Motu Patlu in Vienna as part of boosting tourism in their country. 

Pidilite Rangeela – We did a paid collaboration with Pidilite group wherein Pidilite gave free mini comic books along with its new range of crayons to kids as a promotional gift in the Rangeela Khazana Pack.

Toonpur Ka Super Hero In December 2010, Lotpot had tied up with Ajay Devgan's animation film for children Toonpoor Ka Superhero and has come out with six special editions of the Lotpot.

Characters
The main comic strip characters of the magazine are:
 Motu Patlu – Two friends, one fat man (Motu) and another slim man (Patlu) based on Stan Laurel and Oliver Hardy, who were shown being involved in silly plots and appeared as a fool, but in the new episodes, they were shown as heroes. The supporting characters with them were Dr. Jhatka, Ghasitaram, Chelaram, Dhelaram and Angoothanand. Kripa Shankar Bhardwaj was the original creator of these characters. Motu Patlu has a fan following across 3 generations first in comic books and now through 10 years of 3D animated kids show on Nickelodeon since 2012.
 Sheikh Chilli & Friendz – Sheikh Chilli & his friendz Nuri Gin and Bulbul the donkey lead their lives and come across various obstacles in their small town. Running successfully on  Discovery Kids Tv channel since 2017.
 Master Uncle – Master Uncle a humble but passionate school teacher believes every child is special and enjoys teaching from books along with play, activities, games and live examples. Students feel joy in his presence and have fun during his class, that’s why he is every kids’ favorite teacher. Gugli is the most mischievous kid of his class, who keeps adding to the troubles in the class. Gugli and Master uncles’ challenges to each other, fun and pranks keeps the class in good humour. 
 Minni & the girl gang – The concept rotates around Minni and her gang of friends. Minni and her gang has a band called MINNI going by the initials Minni, IRA, Nandi, Notty (the squirrel) & Ikki. All 4 girls study in the same class. Minni’s father is the principal of their school, because of which all of them also get into trouble sometimes due to Minni’s mischief. Minni’s mother loves to sing, her voice is not melodious but keeps giving Minni’s band suggestions on their music. Minni’s Girl power gang is popular in their school, number one in studies, number one in mischief and not afraid of anyone. If there’s someone in the school who doesn’t like them it’s the CHEEKA gang. They think they are too smart. Their gang members Punnu and Bonga always keep getting involved in fights with Minni.
 Mahabali Vishal – Mahabali Vishal protects the dense forests of southern India along with his Chimp, from poachers and sandalwood smugglers. The forest also has a secret nuclear lab of Indian government and Dr. Bhama is incharge of the lab. He identifies the strength and superhuman abilities of Mahabali Vishal and equips him with new instruments which now enable the superhero to fly as well. Now Vishal will not only protect the forest but also the secret lab with his new found powers and loyal friend the Chimp. 
 Banti & Chutki – Banti & Chutki are a pair of identical twins, both brother & sister are no ordinary twins but have fascinating traits. If one gets hurt both feel pain. If one feels hungry both starts eating. Both are equally mischievous. Whoever's fault or mistake it might be both take responsibility and support the other. The twins have a unique ability since birth, if they hold each other’s hands they can jump really high. As high as tall buildings. As they have strong & long legs.
 Natkhat Neetu – Natkhat Neetu has been a part of Lotpot Comics since 1979. Neetu is our main protagonist. He’s incredibly kind, smart, and naughty! Neetu is bold and always there when people need him. He has an energetic sense of humour and can be witty and excitable. His personality also includes - fast-talking, sarcastic, caring, sympathetic, emotional, loving, appreciative & selfless… He is very athletic and is Football captain in his Dumdum Nagri School. He is in love with his Football (Footi) and his special shoes (Rikki Tikki) … Neetu loves his pet dog, Dogo. He is generally cheerful and adventurous. He’s always excited and up for exploring new things which often leads him to trouble! He gets into sheer panic when confronted with something unknown.
 Jaanbaaz DEVA – Jaanbaaz Deva is none other than Mr. Devkant a scientist living in Devnagri. Devkant has done several discoveries in his lab to protect planet earth. Day and night he keeps devising ways and means to protect earth. Princess Sitara transfers magical powers one night when Devkant is asleep. When he wakes up he finds himself extremely powerful and energized. His body is now Rock solid, he can fly, with one blow break the heaviest objects to pieces.
 Dipu – Master of Slingshot – Dipu is a smart and brave kid. He and his slingshot are both very popular in the entire town for their courage. Dipu's Slingshot is not an ordinary one. Once a spaceship drops a weird object in a nearby forest. Dipu's dad a inspector finds it and brings it home. Dipu makes a slingshot from this object. However, he realizes the power of the object when he shoots a pebble which shoots at the speed of a rocket and destroys the object. Every thief in town is scared of him now.
 Kaka Shri – Kakashri is a mature old man who had started baccha ghar and runs it with the help of Dara for kids who are less fortunate. well respected in the society and city Kakashri can solve any problem with is quick wit and Dara's muscle.
 There were other comic strips, in the magazine of characters like Jasoos Champak & Chiller, Deepu, Chelaram, and Papitaram.

References

External links
 
 https://timesofindia.indiatimes.com/city/goa/through-puzzles-comics-games-govt-reaches-out-to-educate-kids-on-taxes/articleshow/92153103.cms
 https://www.aajtak.in/business/news/story/nirmala-sitharaman-launched-motu-patlu-comic-book-to-educate-genz-about-tax-system-tutk-1480478-2022-06-12?item_title=%E0%A4%85%E0%A4%AC+%E0%A4%B8%E0%A4%AC%E0%A4%95%E0%A5%8B+Tax+Expert+%E0%A4%AC%E0%A4%A8%E0%A4%BE%E0%A4%8F%E0%A4%82%E0%A4%97%E0%A5%87+Motu-Patlu,+%E0%A4%B2%E0%A5%89%E0%A4%A8%E0%A5%8D%E0%A4%9A+%E0%A4%B9%E0%A5%81%E0%A4%88+%E0%A4%AF%E0%A5%87+%E0%A4%B8%E0%A5%8D%E0%A4%AA%E0%A5%87%E0%A4%B6%E0%A4%B2+%E0%A4%95%E0%A5%89%E0%A4%AE%E0%A4%BF%E0%A4%95+%E0%A4%AC%E0%A5%81%E0%A4%95!&video_url=https://akm-img-a-in.tosshub.com/aajtak/images/story/202206/motu_patlu-sixteen_nine.jpg?size%3D749:421
 https://mayapuri.com/learn-the-importance-of-tax-with-the-lot-pot-comic-character-motu-patlu-and-become-a-tax-expert/#google_vignette

1969 comics debuts
1969 establishments in Delhi
English-language magazines published in India
Hindi-language magazines
Indian comics
Children's magazines published in India
Indian comics titles
Magazines established in 1969
Magazines about comics
Multilingual magazines